The 1990 Canadian Open was a tennis tournament played on outdoor hard courts. It was the 101st edition of the Canada Masters and was part of the Championship Series, Single-Week of the 1990 ATP Tour and of Tier I of the 1990 WTA Tour. The men's event took place at the National Tennis Centre in Toronto in Canada from July 23 through July 30, 1990, and the women's event at the du Maurier Stadium in Montreal in Canada from July 30 through August 6, 1990.

Finals

Men's singles

 Michael Chang defeated  Jay Berger 4–6, 6–3, 7–6(7–3)
 It was Chang's only title of the year and the 4th of his career. It was his only Masters title of the year and his 1st overall.

Women's singles

 Steffi Graf defeated  Katerina Maleeva 6–1, 6–7, 6–3
 It was Graf's 5th title of the year and the 58th of her career. It was her 1st Tier I title.

Men's doubles

 Paul Annacone /  David Wheaton defeated  Broderick Dyke /  Peter Lundgren 6–1, 7–6
 It was Annacone's only title of the year and the 15th of his career. It was Wheaton's 2nd title of the year and the 2nd of his career.

Women's doubles

 Betsy Nagelsen /  Gabriela Sabatini defeated  Helen Kelesi /  Raffaella Reggi 3–6, 6–2, 6–2
 It was Nagelsen's only title of the year and the 22nd of her career. It was Sabatini's 2nd title of the year and the 24th of her career.

References

External links
 
 Association of Tennis Professionals (ATP) tournament profile
 Women's Tennis Association (WTA) tournament profile
 1900 Main Draw

Canadian Open
Canadian Open
Canadian Open
Canadian Open
Canadian Open
Canadian Open (tennis)